Fissures (1997) is a collaborative album by ambient musicians Robert Rich and Alio Die (Stefano Musso).

Track listing
”Turning to Stone” – 5:27
”A Canopy of Shivers” – 5:51
”Sirena” – 9:10
”Mycelia” – 8:13
”The Divine Radiance of Invertebrates” – 8:37
”The Road to Wirikuta” – 18:49
”Tree of the Wind” – 5:40

Personnel
Robert Rich – synthesizers, flutes, percussion, dulcimer, lap steel guitar
Stefano Musso – samples, textures and drones

References

External links
Hearts of Space Records Album Page

Robert Rich (musician) albums
1997 albums
Dark ambient albums
Hearts of Space Records albums